is a UK company law and UK insolvency law case, which held that a director's pay and pension was excessive and grossly negligent, and could be recovered after the company went insolvent.

Facts
Mr Lane Bednash was the liquidator of the DGA (UK) Ltd. DGA had provided engineering consulting services. Bednash sought an order under the Insolvency Act 1986 section 212 (misfeasance for breach of a fiduciary duty) and section 238 (transactions at an undervalue) against Mr Hearsey. Mr Hearsey had been the sole beneficial shareholder and controlling director of DGA. DGA had traded successfully in 1991 and 1992, but then its position had worsened. It had gone into liquidation through voluntary winding up proceedings on 24 February 1994. Apparently, in April 1994, there had been a burglary at the office by an unknown person, and all the accounts books had been stolen.

Bednash contended that Hearsey had paid himself an excessive salary and pension contributions.

Judgment

High Court
Nicholas Stewart QC, for the High Court Chancery Division gave judgment on 15 February 2001. He allowed Bednash's claim in part.

In 1991 and 1992, because the company had been successful, and Mr Hearsey had adequately carried out his duties, it could not be said that pay or pension contributions were excessive. That was because there was no significant risk to DGA's creditors.

However, Hearsey's remuneration in following years was objectionable. There was a lack of clear evidence about Hearsey's actions. Despite that, if Hearsey had no reliable view on DGA's financial position, it was not responsible to pay himself large sums of money. Alternatively, if Hearsey had had a reliable view of DGA's finances, paying himself large sums of money would have also been irresponsible, because there had been a substantial risk to DGA's creditors.

Court of Appeal
Sir Martin Nourse (with whom Potter LJ concurred) upheld the decision of the High Court, after Mr Hearsey appealed.

See also
UK insolvency law
UK company law
Re Halt Garage (1964) Ltd [1982] 3 All ER 1016; (Ch D)
Insolvency Act 1986 s 212

Notes

References
A Belcher, ‘Something distinctly not of this character’: how Knightian uncertainty is relevant to corporate governance' (2008) 28(1) Legal Studies 46, 55

Court of Appeal (England and Wales) cases
2001 in case law
2001 in British law
United Kingdom company case law
United Kingdom insolvency case law